Montenegro participated in the 2010 Summer Youth Olympics in Singapore.

Montenegro was represented by 22 athletes competing in 5 sports: Football, Judo, Swimming, Taekwondo and Tennis.

Football

Group D

 Qualified for semifinals

Results

Semi-finals

Bronze-medal match

Judo

Individual

Team

Swimming

Taekwondo

Boys

Tennis

References

External links
Competitors List: Montenegro

2010 in Montenegrin sport
Nations at the 2010 Summer Youth Olympics
Montenegro at the Youth Olympics